Mulberry Hill is a historic plantation house located near Randolph, Charlotte County, Virginia.  The original section dates to the 18th century and forms the slightly projecting, gable-end, two-story front center pavilion.  Flanking this center section are single-bay two-story wings added in the mid-19th century. At the same time, a two-story rear wing was added.  The front facade features a mid-19th century porch with a full Doric order entablature supported on octagonal Doric columns. Also on the property are the contributing Judge Paul Carrington's office building, a brick kitchen, a frame spinning house, a dairy, a smokehouse, a privy, and servants' quarters.  It was the home plantation of 18th century political official and jurist Paul Carrington (1733–1818). He is buried on the plantation grounds.

It was listed on the National Register of Historic Places in 1973.  In 1999 the Butler family donated the plantation to the state as an expansion of Staunton River Battlefield State Park.

References

Plantation houses in Virginia
Houses on the National Register of Historic Places in Virginia
Houses in Charlotte County, Virginia
National Register of Historic Places in Charlotte County, Virginia